The Grave Dust is a 2015 Nigerian supernatural romantic thriller film, directed by Ikechukwu Onyeka, starring Ramsey Nouah, Joke Silva, Joseph Benjamin and Amaka Chukwujekwu.

The film tells the story of Johnson (Ramsey Nouah), an orphaned young stockbroker who is abandoned by his girlfriend Clara (Amaka Chukwujekwu) because of his history of misery, doom and deaths. Johnson falls into depression and it takes the spirit from the  grave to fight for his justice of love.

Cast
Ramsey Nouah as Johnson Okwuozo
Amaka Chukwujekwu as Clara
Joseph Benjamin as Jordan
Joke Silva as Jordan's mother
Emaa Edokpaghi as the Mortician
Paul Apel Papel as  
Emeka Okoro as Chijioke

Production and release
According to the producer Madogwu, The Grave Dust is one of the most unusual stories he has encountered; as a result, much attention was paid to its success. Majek Fashek produced the soundtrack and music score for the film. Trailer of The Grave Dust was released on YouTube on 24 November 2014. The film was initially scheduled to premiere in November 2014, but was postponed to 8 May 2015. The film was eventually released on 29 May.

Reception
Nollywood Reinvented rates the film 43%, commending Ramsey Nouah as the standout act and praising the music, but notes that the film dragged in the middle. It concluded that The Grave Dust "was interestingly woven and revealed, writing-wise. However, somewhere in execution – with the poor acting, the excessive music, occasional fluctuating audio, questionable effects, etc. – it was setback. It was not entirely lost in translation but it could have amounted to much more than it did". Amarachukwu Iwuala of 360Nobs heavily criticized the screenplay and visual effects, commenting "Onyeka serves his audience a film that not only moves at snail’s pace, but one that has been told time and again; the characters and situations created by the screenwriter are very familiar. Most followers of Nollywood are constantly in search of fascinating films that will thoroughly entertain them and also task their imaginations at the same time.  Indeed, there are a couple of horror flicks and thrillers that fit this bill, but The Grave Dust woefully falls below expectations in almost every regard".

References

External links

Nigerian drama films
Nigerian supernatural films
Nigerian thriller films
2010s romantic thriller films
2015 romantic drama films
Nigerian romantic drama films
English-language Nigerian films
Nigerian fantasy films
2010s supernatural films
2015 films
2010s English-language films